Stemphylium lycopersici is a plant pathogen infecting tomatoes, lettuce, Capsicum and papayas.

References

External links 
 Index Fungorum
 USDA ARS Fungal Database

Fungal plant pathogens and diseases
Tomato diseases
Vegetable diseases
Papaya tree diseases
Pleosporaceae